Yeht Mae was an electro-industrial band from California which began in 1988 by vocalist and keyboard programmer Jeremy Daw. Daw was later joined by vocalist Lynda Sterling and released two self-distributed cassette demos. Their first CD "1000 Veins" was released by the British gothic/industrial label Gymnastic Records whose albums were pressed in Germany.  

In 1992, musician and producer Talla 2XLC of the band Bigod 20 signed the band to his label Zoth Ommog Records where they went on to release two more CD albums. 

The band's primary lyrical themes cover strange subjects such as death, experimental surgery, and alien abductions.

Discography
Against Nature - cassette demo (1988)
Endless Enemies - cassette demo (1990)
1000 Veins - CD (1991) Gymnastic Records
Anatomy - CD (1992) Zoth Ommog
Transmitter - CD (1994) Zoth Ommog
eaM theY - CD (1996) Out of Line Music • CD (1997) Metropolis Records

Compilation appearances
Sacred War - CD track #3 Keep the Devil Down (1990) Gymnastic Records
Hurt-A Psychotechnics Compilation - LP Side B track #5Remission - (1991) Braindrops Records
Torture Tech Overdrive - LP Side B track #5 Freedom (1991) If It Moves...
Body Rapture II - CD track #8 Proximity Effect (1992) Zoth Ommog
Zoth In Your Mind - CD track #3 Take Him Out Back (1993) Zoth Ommog
The Colours of Zoth Ommog - CD track #8 Beater (1994) Zoth Ommog
Torture Tech Overdrive - CD track #13 Freedom (1994) Cleopatra Records
Totentanz - The Best of Zoth Ommog 2xCD CD #2 track #7 Gods and Children - (1994) Cleopatra Records
There Is No Time - 4xCD CD #3 track #2 Gun Control (1995) Ras Dva Records
On the Line - CD track #4 Lynaka Says Don't Dream and track #5 Heaven in Hell (1996) Out of Line
Vertigo Compilation (04/1996) - CD track #4 Lynaka Says Don't Dream - (1996) Celtic Circle Productions
Awake the Machines - On the Line Vol. 2 - 2xCD CD #1 track #15 Awake the Machine 1997, Out of Line / Sub/Mission Records
The Complete History of Zoth Ommog: Totentanz - 4xCD CD #2 track #7 Gods and Children - (1999) Cleopatra Records

References

External links
 Discogs.com - Yeht Mae Discography

Musical groups established in 1987
Musical groups disestablished in 1997
American industrial music groups
Zoth Ommog Records artists